Stupné is a village and municipality in Považská Bystrica District in the Trenčín Region of north-western Slovakia in Považie region.

History
In historical records the village was first mentioned in 1416.

Geography
The municipality lies at an altitude of 340 metres and covers an area of 7.519 km². It has a population of about 689 people.

References

External links

 
 http://travelingluck.com/Europe/Slovakia/Slovakia+(general)/_3057382_Stupn%C3%A9.html#invest - Maps of Stupné, Weather in Stupné, sunrise and sunset in Stupné

Villages and municipalities in Považská Bystrica District